The Agent of Death is the third of Nelson DeMille's novels about NYPD Sergeant Joe Ryker. It was published in 1974, and then republished in 1989 with the DeMille pseudonym Jack Cannon as the author and The Death Squad as the title.  The story focuses on Ryker's attempt to stop an unstable CIA assassin in New York City.

External links

1974 American novels
Novels by Nelson DeMille
Novels set in New York City
Leisure Books books